The Syria national under-23 football team is a national association football youth team representing Syria in Olympics, AFC U-23 Championship, WAFF U-23 Championship and any other under-23 international football tournaments. It is controlled by the Syrian Football Association. The team is also known as the Syria Olympic football team.

Results and fixtures

2022

Previous years

* Syria score always listed first

Competitive record

Olympic Games

AFC U-23 Championship

Asian Games 
From 2002 Asian Games, at the first tournament to be played in an under-23 format.

WAFF U-23 Championship

Players

Current squad 
 The following players were selected to compete in the 2022 WAFF U-23 Championship.
 The final squad was announced on 25 October 2022.
 Tournament date: 2–15 November 2022
 Coach: Mark Wotte

* Over-aged player.<noinclude>

Previous squads 

Asian Games
 Football at the 2006 Asian Games squads
 Football at the 2018 Asian Games squads
AFC U-23 Championship
 2013 AFC U-22 Championship squads
 2016 AFC U-23 Championship squads
 2018 AFC U-23 Championship squads
 2020 AFC U-23 Championship squads

Honours

Regional
WAFF U-23 Championship
 Runners-up (1): 2015
 Third place (2): 2021, 2022

See also 
 Syria national football team
 Syria national under-20 football team
 Syria national under-17 football team
 Syrian Football Association
 Football in Syria

References

External links 
Syria national under-23 football team at Soccerway

under-23
Asian national under-23 association football teams